Naliya is a town, which is also the taluka headquarters of Abdasa Taluka of Kutch District, Gujarat, India. It is located on the western end of Kutch 19 km by road from ancient port of Jakhau.

History
Naliya was a prosperous trading town in past who had trading ties with Zanzibar and Bombay. It had  a population of 5238 in 1880.

Climate

Demographics 
In the 2011 census, the village of Naliya had 11,415 inhabitants for a gender ratio of 939 females per thousand males.

Indian Air Force Station
Naliya is home to the Naliya Air Force Station of the Indian Air Force, which was built here in view of the town's proximity to Pakistan.

Transport

Naliya is on National Highway 41. The town had a railway line laid in 1980 to get connected town with Bhuj. The line was abandoned later since Gandhidham-Bhuj section was converted to broad-gauge and this  line became isolated. This line is no longer used for public, military or freight purpose. Recently, gauge conversion to broad gauge has been approved by the Government of India. Work of gauge conversion to broad gauge is completed up till Desalpur,  from Bhuj. The work in remaining  is in Progress. 
The Naliya Cantonment will be the rail station for Naliya Town once gauge conversion is completed. Due to security reason the  railway line stretch between Naliya Cantonment & Naliya Town will not be made since Naliya is situated just  from India-Pakistan border of Sir Creek Marshlands.

Tourism

Naliya Jain Derasar

Naliya is a century old town, which has Jain temples & mosques built several centuries ago. It is a famous Jain pilgrimage center and one of the five famous Jain temples of Abdasa ni Panchtirthi (meaning five-temples of Abdasa) is in the town. Other Jain temples are in nearby places in Abdasa Taluka. The main architects of these centuries old Jain temples were Mistris of Kutch.

Moolnayak Bhagwaan is Chandraprabha. The main idol of Shri Chandraprabhu Bhagwan is Swet varn(white coloured) of about 72 cm in padmasanastha position.

Bustard Sanctuary

Naliya is also famous for Great Indian Bustard Sanctuary also known as Lala–Parjan Sanctuary, which is located nearby the town. With an area of about only 2 square kilometers, it is the smallest sanctuary in the country. There are approximately 30 great Indian bustards here, second only to Desert National Park, Rajasthan.

References

Cities and towns in Kutch district